The 2007 Dubai World Cup was a horse race held at Nad Al Sheba Racecourse on Saturday 31 March 2007. It was the 12th running of the Dubai World Cup.

The winner was Hamdan Al Maktoum's Argentinian-bred Invasor, a five-year-old brown horse trained in the United States by Kiaran McLaughlin and ridden by Fernando Jara. Curlin's victory was the first in the race for his jockey and trainer and the second for Hamdan Al Maktoum, who had won the race with Almutawakel in 1999.

Originally trained in Uruguay, Invasor won the local Triple Crown before being bought by Hamdan Al Maktoum and transferred to McLaughlin's American stable. On his debut for his new connections he sustained his only defeat when finishing fourth to Discreet Cat in the UAE Derby. He was voted American Horse of the Year for 2006 after winning the Pimlico Special, Suburban Handicap, Whitney Handicap and Breeders' Cup Classic. In 2007 he won the Donn Handicap before being shipped to Dubai. In the 2007 Dubai World Cup he started the 5/4 favourite and won by one and three quarter lengths from the American-trained Premium Tap, with the Hong Kong challenger Bullish Luck eight lengths back in third. Discreet Cat started the 11/8 second favourite but finished last of the seven runners.

Race details
 Sponsor: Emirates Airline
 Purse: £3,061,224; First prize: £1,836,735
 Surface: Dirt
 Going: Fast
 Distance: 10 furlongs
 Number of runners: 7
 Winner's time: 1:59.97

Full result

 Abbreviations: nse = nose; nk = neck; shd = head; hd = head; nk = neck

Winner's details
Further details of the winner, Invasor
 Sex: Stallion
 Foaled: 3 August 2002
 Country: Argentina
 Sire: Candy Stripes; Dam: Quendom (Interprete)
 Owner: Hamdan Al Maktoum
 Breeder: Haras Clausan

References

Dubai World Cup
Dubai World Cup
Dubai World Cup
Dubai World Cup